In fiction, a zombie animal is a non-human creature that becomes a zombie. Numerous types of animals have been portrayed as zombies - a zombie dog appeared in the film The Last Man on Earth in 1964, and an infected dog is the source of the zombie virus in REC (2007). Night of the Zombies (1984) features a scare from a zombie cat, as does Scouts Guide to the Zombie Apocalypse. A jump scare scene featuring zombie dogs in the first Resident Evil is considered to be a seminal horror scene in video game history.

In real life

While predominantly a fictional concept when applied to larger mammals, there have been instances of insects, such as ants and wasps, becoming "zombies" from a real world perspective. For example, the Cordyceps fungus is known to infect insects and change their behavior before their eventual death.

See also
 Zombie apocalypse

References

Corporeal undead
Fictional diseases and disorders

Horror fiction
Topics in culture

Fictional animals
Broad-concept articles